Learning Is Impossible is the first studio album by the American punk rock band False Alarm, which was released in 1998.

Track listing 
 "Learning Is Impossible" — 1:23
 "I Hate Everyone" — 1:37
 "Even Though" — 1:57
 "Can't Get Into a Bar" — 1:17
 "Government Has a War" — 2:01
 "Skitzo-Free-N-Yeah" — 2:09
 "Self-Destruct" — 1:13

Personnel 
False Alarm
 Paul Aragon — lead vocals
 Floyd Aragon — guitar
 Dylan Maunder — guitar
 Brent Alden — bass
 Art Chianello — drums
with:
 Fat Mike — lead vocals (7)
 Justin Time — drums (7)

1998 debut albums
False Alarm (band) albums